SOTW may refer to:
 Ottweiler (Saar) station
 "Smoke on the Water", a song by Deep Purple
 Spirit of the West (disambiguation)
 Secret of the Wings, a 2012 Disney film